"Endless Sorrow"  is a song recorded by Japanese singer Ayumi Hamasaki, released as her 22nd single on May 16, 2001.

Background
This was Hamasaki's fourth single to be composed by herself using the pseudonym Crea. Its original single version, which features strings, piano, and rock leanings, was arranged by CMJK and Junichi Matsuda. For Hamasaki's fourth studio album I am... the song re-arranged by CMJK in a version entitled "Gone With Whe Wind ver.", which has a calmer soft-rock oriented sound. "Endless Sorrow" was used as theme song of TBS's drama Mukashi no Otoko, which aired from April to late June 2001. One of the b-sides of the single, "Vogue (Kirari Natsu Ayu Mix)" was used in TV commercials for Kose Visee mascara, starring Hamasaki herself.

Music video
The music video of "Endless Sorrow" inspired by the film Equilibrium depicts a young boy living in a society in which speaking was prohibited by law. The boy, however, climbs a tower, meeting a man (presumably a priest because of his clothing) and a one-winged angel who looks exactly like the boy. Apart from shots of the cover of the Endless Sorrow single, Hamasaki does not appear in the original version of the PV, but in a later version, Hamasaki appears at the end of the video in a trench coat and fedora, and picks up the feather dropped by the boy.

Track listing
Lyrics: Ayumi Hamasaki - Music: Ayumi Hamasaki
 "Endless Sorrow"
 "Vogue" (Kirari Natsu Ayu Mix)
 "Endless Sorrow" (Natural Green Dub Mix)
 "Endless Sorrow" (Nicely Nice Skyblue remix)
 "Never Ever" (Dub's Uncategorized Mix 001)
 "Endless Sorrow" (Ram's Advance Mix)
 "Endless Sorrow" (Brent Mini's gothic mix)
 "Endless Sorrow" (Liquid Heart Mix)
 "Endless Sorrow" (Juicy Ariyama Mix)
 "Endless Sorrow" (Instrumental)

Live performances 
July 1, 2001 - CountDown TV - Endless sorrow and Unite!
December 2, 2001 - Digital Dream Live - Endless sorrow and Evolution

Charts 
Oricon Sales Chart (Japan)

 RIAJ certification: 3× Platinum

References

External links
 Endless sorrow information at Avex Network.
 Endless sorrow information at Oricon.

Ayumi Hamasaki songs
2001 singles
Oricon Weekly number-one singles
Songs written by Ayumi Hamasaki
Japanese television drama theme songs
2001 songs
Avex Trax singles